Prioniomus is a genus of beetles in the family Carabidae, containing the following species:

 Prioniomus abnormis (J.Sahlberg, 1900)
 Prioniomus aegeicus Giachino & Vailati, 2019
 Prioniomus antonellae Giachino & Vailati, 2011
 Prioniomus assingi Giachino & Vailati, 2019
 Prioniomus brachati Giachino & Vailati, 2019
 Prioniomus caoduroi Giachino & Vailati, 2012
 Prioniomus cassiopaeus Pavesi, 2010
 Prioniomus etontii Giachino & Vailati, 2011
 Prioniomus gabriellae Giachino & Vailati, 2011
 Prioniomus giachinoi Vailati, 2002
 Prioniomus lombardorum Fancello & Magrini, 2015
 Prioniomus lompei Giachino & Vailati, 2019
 Prioniomus maleficus Giachino & Vailati, 2012
 Prioniomus menozzii (Schatzmayr, 1936)
 Prioniomus meybohmi Giachino & Vailati, 2019
 Prioniomus moczarskii Jeannel, 1937
 Prioniomus pedemontanorum Fancello & Magrini, 2015
 Prioniomus peloponnesiacus Giachino & Vailati, 2011
 Prioniomus scaramozzinoi Giachino & Vailati, 2011
 Prioniomus strinatii (Coiffait, 1956)
 Prioniomus vailatii Giachino, 2001

References

Trechinae